"Wait for Love" is a 1985 song by American recording artist Luther Vandross released in 1985. The song was released as a single to support his album The Night I Fell in Love. The single peaked to eleven on Billboards Hot R&B Singles chart. Vandross performed the song on the November 22, 1986 episode of Soul Train and on the BET Walk of Fame in 2000.

Charts

References

External links
 www.luthervandross.com

1985 songs
Luther Vandross songs
1985 singles
Songs written by Luther Vandross
Epic Records singles
Songs written by Nat Adderley Jr.